Moussa Samba (Arabic: موسى سامبا) is a Mauritanian footballer who plays as a midfielder for the Mauritania national team.

International career

International goals
Scores and results list Mauritania's goal tally first.

References

External links 
 

Living people
1988 births
Mauritanian footballers
Mauritania international footballers
Association football midfielders
FC Tevragh-Zeina players
Al-Nasr SC (Benghazi) players
Al-Qaisumah FC players
Saudi Second Division players
Mauritanian expatriate footballers
Expatriate footballers in Libya
Expatriate footballers in Saudi Arabia
Mauritanian expatriate sportspeople in Saudi Arabia
Libyan Premier League players
Mauritanian expatriate sportspeople in Libya
Mauritania A' international footballers
2018 African Nations Championship players